Area code 340 is the local telephone area code of the U.S. Virgin Islands. The 340 area code was created during a split from the original 809 area code, which began permissive dialing on 1 June 1997 and ended 30 June 1998.

When in the U.S. Virgin Islands, one can dial the seven digits without needing to dial the area code. When calling to the U.S. Virgin Islands from anywhere in the United States or Canada dial 1 + 340 + seven digit phone number.

See also
List of NANP area codes
North American Numbering Plan
Area codes in the Caribbean

External links
North American Numbering Plan Administrator
List of exchanges from AreaCodeDownload.com, 340 Area Code

340
Communications in the United States Virgin Islands
1997 establishments in the United States Virgin Islands